Topcolor is a model in theoretical physics, of dynamical electroweak symmetry breaking in which the top quark and anti-top quark form a composite Higgs boson by a new force arising from massive "top gluons". The solution to composite Higgs models was actually anticipated in 1981, and found to be the Infrared fixed point for the top quark mass.

Analogy with known physics
The composite Higgs boson made from a bound pair of top-anti-top quarks is analogous to the phenomenon of superconductivity, where Cooper pairs are formed by the exchange of phonons. The pairing dynamics and its solution was treated in the Bardeen-Hill-Lindner model.

The original topcolor naturally involved an extension of the standard model color gauge group to a product group SU(3)×SU(3)×SU(3)×... One of the gauge groups contains
the top and bottom quarks, and has a sufficiently large coupling constant to cause the condensate to form. The topcolor model anticipates the idea of dimensional deconstruction and extra space dimensions, as well as the large mass of the top quark.

In 2019 this was revisited ("scalar democracy") in which many composite Higgs bosons may form at very high energies, composed of the known quarks and leptons, perhaps bound by universal force (e.g., gravity, or an extension of topcolor). The standard model Higgs boson is then a top-anti-top boundstate. The theory predicts many new Higgs doublets, starting at the TeV mass scale, with  couplings to the known fermions, that may explain their masses and mixing angles. The first sequential new Higgs bosons should be accessible to the LHC.

See also 
 Fermion condensate
 Technicolor (physics)
 Hierarchy problem
 Top quark condensate

References
 

Physics beyond the Standard Model